Health Spending Accounts (HSA) are Self-insured Private Health Services Plan (PHSP) benefits
arranged by Employers for their Employees residing in Canada. Private Health Services Plans are described in Canada Revenue Agency (CRA) Income Tax Bulletin IT-339R2 "Meaning of PHSP" for Health and Dental Care Expenses described in Income Tax Bulletin IT-519R2 "Medical Expenses".

Health Spending Accounts can be utilized to 1. supplement Insured Private Health Services Plans, or implemented as 2. "stand-alone" plans instead of Insured Private Health Services Plans. Private Health Services Plans (which may take the form of Health Spending Accounts) may form part of a Health and Welfare Trust (see IT-85R2) or Flexible Employee Benefit Program (see IT-529).

Definition 

Health Spending Accounts are specified maximum Annual Allocations of funds exclusively for the purpose of health care spending. In some Health Spending Accounts, the company makes advance payments (incl. Administration Fees and Taxes) on behalf of Employees, for Health and/or Dental expenses. In other Health Spending Accounts, payments can be made on a "pay as you go" basis. 

Eligible claims are reimbursed to the employee (must be a bona fide employee and not just a shareholder or unincorporated owner), and are non-taxable benefits for the employee. Expenses (claims, administration fees and taxes) are a 100% business deduction for the employer.

Health Spending Account restrictions 
 
Health Spending Accounts are not available to unincorporated business owners without arms-length employees, as the Canada Revenue Agency would view such payments as a taxable transfer of funds, even if a third party is used as an intermediate step in the transfer of funds.  However a pre-paid premium plans, insured by an insurer, are allowable as Private Health Services Plans.

Eligible expenses 
 
Eligible Expenses are medical expenses which would otherwise qualify as medical expenses within (currently) Section 118.2(2) of the Income Tax Act, and as interpreted by the Canada Revenue Agency (CRA) in Income Tax Folio S1F1C1 "Medical Expenses". These are the same medical expenses as allowed under the Medical Expense Tax Credit (METC) and can be obtained from the CRA website.

Popularity 
 
Health Spending Accounts are used by employers to provide Health and/or Dental benefits for employees, in conjunction with insured plans or as standalone plans. All benefits allowed under the Tax Act are allowed, as compared to the restricted benefits and dollar maximums of PHSP included in insured group benefits plans. Health Spending Accounts provide substantial reductions in actuarial, administration, adjudication and marketing expenses compared to insured PHSP, by maximizing employee benefits and reducing employer cost.

Providers of Health Spending Accounts 

Trustees, third party administrators and insurers provide versions of the HSA to Canadian employers.

References 

Healthcare in Canada
Taxation in Canada